Handball at the 2004 Summer Olympics included a men's and a women's team competitions with the preliminary rounds taking place in the Sports Pavilion at the Faliro Coastal Zone Olympic Complex. From the quarter final stage onwards, the women's event moved to the Helliniko Olympic Indoor Arena, a part of the Helliniko Olympic Complex, with the men joining them there for their semi-finals and final.

The men's Handball event first made an appearance, played outside, at the 1936 Summer Olympics in Berlin, Germany but did not then re-appear until the Games returned to Germany for the Munich Olympics in 1972 since when it has been ever present. The women's game debuted in Montreal, Quebec, Canada at the 1976 Summer Olympics and again has been ever present since.

Medal summary

Medal table

Teams

Men
The men's event involved twelve teams split equally into two groups.

Group A: 

 

Group B:

Women
The women's event involved ten teams split in two groups.

Group A: 

Group B: 

When all teams within a group have played each other in both men's and women's competitions the top four from each group will progress into their respective quarter finals.

References

 
2004 Summer Olympics events
O
2004